André de Longjumeau (also known as Andrew of Longjumeau in English) was a 13th-century Dominican missionary and diplomat and one of the most active Occidental diplomats in the East in the 13th century. He led two embassies to the Mongols: the first carried letters from Pope Innocent IV and the second bore gifts and letters from Louis IX of France to Güyük Khan. Well acquainted with the Middle-East, he spoke Arabic and "Chaldean" (thought to be either Syriac or Persian).

Mission for the holy Crown of Thorns

André's first mission to the East was when he was asked by the French king Louis IX to go to Constantinople to obtain the Crown of Thorns which had been sold to him by the Latin Emperor Baldwin II in 1238, who was anxious to obtain support for his empire. André was accompanied on this mission by a Dominican friar, brother Jacques.

Papal mission to the Mongols (1245–1247)
André of Longjumeau led one of four missions dispatched to the Mongols by Pope Innocent IV. He left Lyon in the spring of 1245 for the Levant. 
He visited Muslim principalities in Syria and representatives of the Nestorian and Jacobite churches in Persia, finally delivering the papal correspondence to a Mongol general near Tabriz. In Tabriz, André de Longjumeau met with a monk from the Far East, named Simeon Rabban Ata, who had been put in charge by the Khan of protecting the Christians in the Middle-East.

Second mission to the Mongols (1249–1251)

At the Mongol camp near Kars, André had met a certain David, who in December 1248 appeared at the court of King Louis IX of France in Cyprus. André, who was now with the French King, interpreted David's, a real or pretended offer of alliance from the Mongol general Eljigidei, and a proposal of a joint attack upon the Islamic powers of Syria. In reply to this the French sovereign dispatched André as his ambassador to Güyük Khan. Longjumeau went with his brother Jacques (also a Dominican) and several others – John Goderiche, John of Carcassonne, Herbert "Le Sommelier", Gerbert of Sens, Robert (a clerk), a certain William, and an unnamed clerk of Poissy.

The party set out on 16 February 1249, with letters from King Louis and the papal legate, and rich presents, including a chapel-tent lined with scarlet cloth and embroidered with sacred pictures. From Cyprus they went to the port of Antioch in Syria, and thence traveled for a year to the Khan's court, going ten leagues (55.56 kilometers) per day. Their route led them through Persia, along the southern and eastern shores of the Caspian Sea, and certainly through Talas, north-east of Tashkent.

On arrival at the supreme Mongol court – either that on the Imyl river (near Lake Alakol and the present Russo-Chinese frontier in the Altai), or more probably at or near Karakorum itself, south-west of Lake Baikal – André found Güyük Khan dead, poisoned, as the envoy supposed, by Batu Khan's agents. The regent-mother Oghul Qaimish (the "Camus" of William of Rubruck) seems to have received and dismissed him with presents and a dismissive letter for Louis IX. But it is certain that before the friar had left "Tartary", Möngke, Güyük's successor, had been elected.

André's report to his sovereign, whom he rejoined in 1251 at Caesarea in Palestine, appears to have been a mixture of history and fable; the latter affects his narrative of the Mongols' rise to greatness, and the struggles of their leader Genghis Khan with the mythical Prester John, and in the supposed location of the Mongols' homeland, close to the prison of Gog and Magog. On the other hand, the envoy's account of Mongol customs is fairly accurate, and his statements about Mongol Christianity and its prosperity, though perhaps exaggerated (e.g. as to the 800 chapels on wheels in the nomadic host) are likely factual.

Mounds of bones marked his road, witnesses of devastations that other historians record in detail. He found Christian prisoners from Germany in the heart of "Tartary" (at Talas) and was compelled to observe the ceremony of passing between two fires, as a bringer of gifts to a dead Khan, gifts which were treated by the Mongols as evidence of submission. This insulting behavior, and the language of the letter with which André reappeared, marked the mission a failure: King Louis, says Joinville, "se repenti fort" ("felt very sorry").

Death
The date and location of André's death is unknown.

We only know of André through references in other writers: see especially William of Rubruck's in Recueil de voyages, iv. (Paris, 1839), pp. 261, 265, 279, 296, 310, 353, 363, 370; Joinville, ed. Francisque Michel (1858, etc.), pp. 142, etc.; Jean Pierre Sarrasin, in same vol., pp. 254–235; William of Nangis in Recueil des historiens des Gaules, xx. 359–367; Rémusat, Mémoires sur les relations politiques des princes chrétiens… avec les… Mongols (1822, etc.), p. 52.

See also
Giovanni da Pian del Carpine
Lawrence of Portugal
Ascelin of Lombardia
Simon of St Quentin
Exploration of Asia
Franco-Mongol alliance

Notes

References
 
 
 

13th-century explorers
French Dominicans
Roman Catholic missionaries in Mongolia
Diplomats of the Holy See
French diplomats
French explorers
Explorers of Asia
13th-century births
13th-century deaths
Ambassadors to the Mongol Empire
French Roman Catholic missionaries
Dominican missionaries
French expatriates in Mongolia
13th-century diplomats
Christians of the Sixth Crusade